Holzerath is a municipality in the Trier-Saarburg district, in Rhineland-Palatinate, Germany. The total population is 431 as of December 31, 2018. The Mayor is Freedbert Theis. The size of Holzerath is 6.76 km2 with elevation of 453 meters (1,486 feet).

References

Trier-Saarburg